John's First Expedition to Ireland refers to a visit to the Island of Ireland by John Plantagenet as part of a campaign to secure the influence of the House of Plantagenet and the Crown of England, who planned to set up a Kingdom of Ireland within the Angevin Empire. John was  himself a future King of England, the son of Henry II of England and had been declared Lord of Ireland by his father at the Council of Oxford in 1177. Despite his own ambitions for the Kingdom of Jerusalem, John Lackland was sent west to Ireland by his father and landed at Waterford in April 1185.

The inexperienced young prince managed to offend the customs of the Irish Gaels who had met him diplomatically. John (who struggled to pay his own men) attempted to promise knights who traveled with him with Gaelic lands, which further irritated the natives. Aside from these concerns, he grew an intense dislike of the powerful Viceroy of Ireland, Hugh de Lacy, who held the Lordship of Meath, following his conquest of the Gaelic Kingdom of Meath. Following the Norman invasion of Ireland, the Plantagenets were repeatedly concerned with Norman barons, nominally loyal to them, becoming too powerful in Ireland and this was the case with the successful (militarily and diplomatically) de Lacys.

John returned to England in December 1185 and complained bitterly to his father about the influence of de Lacy in Ireland. Much to the relief of the Plantagenets, the following year, de Lacy himself was assassinated at Durrow by an Irishman, Giolla Gan Mathiar Ó Maidhaigh. Plans were made for John to return to Ireland and the new Pope Urban III was more favourable than his predecessors to granting him the title King of Ireland. However, this was cancelled due to the death of John's brother Geoffrey II, Duke of Brittany. John would later return to Ireland for a second time in 1210 while King of England, as part of a campaign to crush a rebellion by a section of Norman lords; this time he was far more successful.

Preparation
The subject of John going to Ireland first came into question under the reign of his father, Henry II, specifically with the Council of Oxford in 1177.  This council dismissed William FitzAldelm as Lord of Ireland agreed to have John made King of Ireland. This would appear to have been a strategy of his father's to divide his Angevin possessions between his four sons. The approval of Pope Alexander III was sought to have John crowned King of Ireland. Disagreements with first Alexander III and then his successor Pope Lucius III caused this to be delayed and instead John went as only Lord of Ireland.

In 1184 arrangements were made for John's departure with the sending of John Cumin and Philip of Worcester to prepare the ground for John's arrival. John arrived in Ireland in April 1185, landing at Waterford with around 300 knights and numerous foot soldiers and archers.

Progress

Upon his arrival in Ireland, John and his retinue were greeted by numerous unnamed Gaelic Irish leaders. It is said that upon seeing these strange long bearded Kings, John and his retinue laughed and pulled them about by their beards. Gerald of Wales said that the Irish then complained to their overlords — men such as Domhnall Mór Ó Briain — of how John was "an ill-mannered child… from whom no good could be hoped".  Aside from upsetting these rulers, John also at this time engaged in a vigorous program of extending land grants to trusted royal administrators such as Theobald Walter, William de Burgh, Gilbert Pipard and Bertram de Verdun as well as other minor land grants to lesser figures. Their Hiberno-Norman descendants, such as Walter's Butler dynasty, would long remain influential.

During his stay in Ireland, John largely followed the route his father Henry II had taken in 1171–72, landing in Waterford and ending up in Dublin. John's expedition founded several castles along the way, especially in Western Waterford and Southern Tipperary, and also established the foundations of administration and law which he later expanded upon in his second expedition in 1210.

Departure
John alienated many of the island's resident elites (Irish and English), lost most of his army in battle or through desertion, and returned to England less than a year after arriving.  Scholars have largely agreed that this was most likely to do with the presence of Hugh de Lacy but it is also likely that John ran out of money. It has been suggested that his departure was a setback in much broader plan to set up administrative structures in Ireland in order to control the unruly Barons via loyal, royalist forces such as Walter, De Burgh and De Verdon and that when De Lacy began to threaten his position, he escaped back to the safety of England.

Upon his departure, his father Henry granted the office of justiciar to the Baron John de Courcy, who had massive influence in Ulster. In 1186 Hugh De Lacy was assassinated by an Irishman and  plans were made to send John back to Ireland. However, the death of his brother, Geoffrey II, Duke of Brittany, in France cancelled these plans and John did not return to Ireland until his second expedition in 1210.

Historiography
The expedition has attracted much historical debate due to the lack of government records available and the subsequent reliance on sources such as the Irish Annals and the writings of Gerald.

References

 Duffy S., ‘Ireland in the Middle Ages’, London (1997).
 Duffy S., ‘John and Ireland: the Origins of England's Irish Problem’ found in Church S.D., ‘King John: New Interpretations’, Woodbridge (1999).
 Flanagan M.T., ‘Household favorites: Angevin royal agents in Ireland under Henry II and John’ found in Smith A.P., ‘Studies in Early Medieval Irish Archaeology, History and Literature’, Dublin (2000).
 Frame R., ‘Colonial Ireland 1169–1369’, Dublin (1981).
 Frame R., ‘The Political Development of the British Isles 1100–1400’, Oxford (1990).
 Lydon J., ‘The English in Medieval Ireland’, Dublin (1984).
 Lydon J., ‘The Lordship of Ireland in the Middle Ages’, Dublin (1972).
 Orpen, G.H., ‘Ireland under the Normans, Vol. II’, Oxford (1911).
 Otway-Ruthven A.J., ‘A History of Medieval Ireland’, London (1968)
 Robert Bartlett,  Gerald of Wales (c.1146–1223), Oxford Dictionary of National Biography, Oxford (2004) — accessed 31 Oct 2004.
 Trans: Hennesey W., ‘The Annals of Loch Cé: a chronicle of Irish affairs from A.D. 1014 to A.D. 1590’, London (1871).
 Warren W.L., ‘John in Ireland, 1185’ found in, Bissy & Jupp, ‘Essays presented to Michael Roberts’, Belfast (1976).
 Warren W.L., ‘Lord of Ireland — a lost opportunity’ found in King John, London (1961).

External links
 King John († 1216) and the origins of colonial rule in Ireland at History Ireland
 “Relentlessly striving for more”: Hugh de Lacy in Ireland at History Ireland

Lordship of Ireland
1185 in Ireland
John, King of England
1180s in England
Military expeditions
Expeditions from the Kingdom of England